Nek Muhammad Shaikh is a physicist and Professor at Institute of Physics, University of Sindh, Jamshoro, Pakistan. He did his PhD in Laser spectroscopy in 2007 from Quaid-e-Azam university Islamabad.

References

Living people
Sindhi people
Year of birth missing (living people)